Phatak or Phaatak is a Yaduvanshi clan or a sub-caste of the Indian Yaduvansh-Yadav community.

Origin
Locally in Braj region, Which includes Mathura, Shikohabad, Jalesar, Agra, Hathras, Aligarh, Etah, Mainpuri and
Farrukhabad districts of Uttar Pradesh, Phataks are Yadav(Ahir).
The Phatak clan claim to be descended from King Digpal Pal singh, Raja of Mahaban, an Yaduvanshi 

The legend goes as : 
"Once the Raja of Chittor was invaded by the emperor of Delhi. One out of the 12 gates (Phataks) of the city resisted. To commemorate the signal of bravery of the guard Katera of the 12 gate, the king issued a decree that they and their descendants should forever be known after the name of Phatak.

History
The Phatak prince Bijay Singh took possession of Samohan Chaurasi area, dispossessing the Mewatis owners of the land in 1106 (samvat era). After the capture of Samohan Chaurasi area, the Phataks proceeded towards Yamuna river, displacing aborigines they established themselves in the whole Shikohabad Pargana.

The evidences show that female infanticide was practiced commonly among Chauhan Rajputs and Phatak Yadavs. In 1865, Mr. Colvin observed census of the Chauhan and Phatak villages in Mainpuri and found six villages without a single female infant.

1857 Mutiny
In the district Mainpuri, no active participation was noticed as a national attempt at the subversion of government authority. British Officials later took the view that "there was no mass rising of the agricultural communities in Mainpuri but rather a struggle for the mastery between two land owning castes, the Chauhans and the Ahirs."

The Ahirs of Bharaul successfully repulsed Tez Singh while their Ahir caste brethren, Ram Ratan and Bhagwan Singh of Rampur Village kept the whole Mustafabad in a state of rebellion and fought against British rule.

See also
Ahir clans

References

British Indian history
Ahir